B. elegans may refer to:
 Bailiaspis elegans, a trilobite from the Cambrian
 Bajaichthys elegans, an extinct Lutetian lamprid fish from the Monte Bolca Lagerstatten
 Balacra elegans, a moth
 Banksia elegans, a shrub or small tree found only over a 65 square kilometre area north and west of Eneabba, Western Australia
 Bathyporeia elegans, an amphipod
 Beaufortia elegans, a shrub
 Bero elegans, a fish
 Birkenia elegans, a prehistoric jawless fish
 Bomarea elegans, a flowering plant
 Bonamia elegans (syn. Breweria elegans or Breweriopsis elegans), a flowering plant found in Myanmar
 Bothriospila elegans, a beetle
 Botryllus elegans, a colonial ascidian tunicate found in Mozambique and South Africa
 Brachinus elegans, a ground beetle
 Breynia elegans, a sea urchin
 Brodiaea elegans, a flowering plant
 Bufonaria elegans, a sea snail